was a member of the martial Hidesato branch of the Fujiwaras and was the father of Fujiwara no Kiyohira, founder of the Northern Fujiwara dynasty in Japan. From the Japanese viewpoint he was considered a notorious traitor.

He is said to have come from the Watari District in what is now southern Miyagi Prefecture. He served for a time as a military bureaucrat at Fort Taga in modern-day Tagajō, Miyagi Prefecture.

When the Zenkunen War (前九年合戦) broke out he fought with the Abes against the Central government forces led by the governor of Mutsu Province, Minamoto no Yoriyoshi. For this he was branded a traitor. After the Abe were defeated in 1062, Tsunekiyo was beheaded with a blunt sword by Yoriyoshi personally.

1062 deaths
Fujiwara clan
Ōshu-Fujiwara clan
People from Iwate Prefecture
People of Heian-period Japan
Year of birth unknown